Bouchetia vaubanensis is a species of sea snail, a marine gastropod mollusk in the family Muricidae, the murex snails or rock snails.

Description
The shell grows to a length of  10 mm.

Distribution
This marine species can be found off New Caledonia.

References

 Houart R. (1986 ["1985"]). Mollusca Gastropoda: Noteworthy Muricidae from the Pacific Ocean, with description of seven new species. in: Forest, J. (Ed.) Résultats des Campagnes MUSORSTOM I et II Philippines (1976, 1980). Tome 2. Mémoires du Muséum national d'Histoire naturelle. Série A, Zoologie. 133: 427-455
 Houart, R.; Héros, V. (2008). Muricidae (Mollusca: Gastropoda) from Fiji and Tonga. in: Héros, V. et al. (Ed.) Tropical Deep-Sea Benthos 25. Mémoires du Muséum national d'Histoire naturelle (1993). 196: 437-480.
 Merle D., Garrigues B. & Pointier J.-P. (2011) Fossil and Recent Muricidae of the world. Part Muricinae. Hackenheim: Conchbooks. 648 pp. page(s): 174

External links
 MNHN, Paris: holotype

Muricidae
Gastropods described in 1986